The 2019 Bath and North East Somerset Council election was held on 2 May 2019 to elect members of Bath and North East Somerset Council in England.

The Liberal Democrats took control of the council in 2019, winning thirty-seven seats with a working majority of seven.

Background 
Bath and North East Somerset Council held local elections on 2 May 2019 along with councils across England as part of the 2019 local elections. The council elects its members in all-out elections, with all its councillors up for election every four years. Councillors defending their seats in this election were previously elected in 2015. In that election, thirty-seven Conservative councillors, fifteen Liberal Democrat councillors, six Labour councillors, five independent councillors and two Green councillors were elected. In subsequent by-elections, the Liberal Democrats gained one seat from the Conservatives and one seat from the Green Party. Conservative councillor Martin Veal resigned from his party in March 2019 to run as an independent after his party did not select him as a candidate.

Following the 2015 election, the council was controlled by the Conservative Party, although previously the council had been under no overall control since its creation in 1996. In the New Statesman, the journalist Stephen Bush wrote that if the Conservatives maintained control of Bath and North East Somerset in 2019, it would represent a strong national performance for the party. Conservative peer Robert Hayward predicted that the Liberal Democrats would gain several seats on the council from the Conservatives due to a "Brexit penalty".

A boundary change in 2018 meant that the number of councillors fell to 59 from the 65 under previous boundaries, and the number of electoral wards reduced from 37 to 33. Most retained electoral wards have their boundaries adjusted so the number of electors per councillor is roughly similar.

The election was contested by full slates of Conservatives and Liberal Democrats, with 49 Labour candidates, 29 Green Party candidates, 12 independent candidates (including one candidate with no description), 11 candidates for the Bath North East Somerset Independent Group, and five UK Independence Party candidates. Two of the independent councillors re-elected in 2019 identified as "No politics, just Peasedown" when elected in 2015.

Retiring councillors

Council composition
After the previous election the composition of the council was:

Prior to the election the composition of the council was:

After the election the composition of the council was:

Results summary

Ward results
As the wards were newly created, comparisons with previous elections are not possible.
All percentages are calculated as the proportion of valid votes won by each councillor.

Sitting councillors are marked with an asterisk (*).

Bathavon North

Bathavon South

Bathwick

Chew Valley

Clutton & Farmborough

Combe Down

High Littleton

Keynsham East

Keynsham North

Keynsham South

Kingsmead

Lambridge

Lansdown

Mendip

Midsomer Norton North

Midsomer Norton Redfield

Moorlands

Newbridge

Odd Down

Oldfield Park

Paulton

Peasedown

Publow with Whitchurch

Radstock

Saltford

Southdown

Timsbury

Twerton

Walcot

Westfield

Westmoreland

Weston

Widcombe & Lyncombe

References

2019 English local elections
2019
2010s in Somerset
May 2019 events in the United Kingdom
Combe Down